Arnold Borisovich Lakhovsky (also known as Aaron Berkovich; born 1880 – 1937) was a painter and sculptor of Ukrainian-Jewish descent, he was known for his landscape paintings.

Lakhovsky completed his art education at the Art Academy of Odessa, and also in Munich and Saint Petersburg, where he eventually resided. In 1925 he emigrated to Paris, and his paintings were exhibited in an art museum there. Later in 1933 he finally moved to New York City and taught at Boston's School of the Museum of Fine Arts.

Biography 
Arnold Borisovich Lakhovsky was born  in Chernobyl, Russian Empire.

Having graduated from Odessa Art School (1902), where he studied in the workshops of K. Kostandi and G. Ladyzhensky, he later studied at the workshop of Maro at the Fine Arts Academy in Munich, Germany.

In 1904 he moved to St. Petersburg, Russia, to join the workshop of Ilya Repin at the Royal Academy of Arts Higher Fine Art School. In 1908 he left for Palestine and spent 3 months teaching at Bezalel Art School (now Bezalel Academy of Arts and Design) in Jerusalem.

Having returned to Russia, he continued his studies at the Higher Fine Art School at the workshops of P. Tchistyakov (1908–09), A. Kiselyov (1909–11), and N. Doubovskoy (1911–12). Graduated at A-level on November 1, 1912. Awarded the "qualified artist" title for The Last Rays painting in 1912.

Lakhovsky lived in St. Petersbourg and worked mostly in the city and its suburbs and Northwest Russia, including the town of Pskov. He joined the Kouindgi Society (1915) and The Wanderers Society (1916). He became one of the founding members of the Jewish Arts Encouragement Society in November 1915, donating his works to charity auctions.

In 1925, Lakhovsky was invited by the Luxembourg Museum in Paris and left for France. He was a board member of the artists section of the Russian Artists Union in France.

In 1933 he moved to New York City, where his main occupation was painting portraits on commission. In 1935, along with Boris Grigoriev and A. Yakovlev, he taught at the School of the Museum of Fine Arts, Boston.

Lakhovsky died on January 7, 1937, at Beth Israel Hospital in New York City of leukemia, followed by pneumonia. He was buried at Beth David Elmont cemetery in Long Island, New York.

References

External links 

 Garmash, Tatiana. Lakhovsky. Moscow, Asrea-Center Publishers, 2014. – 204 p. (in Russian)

Ukrainian painters
Ukrainian male painters
19th-century painters from the Russian Empire
Russian male painters
20th-century Russian painters
American people of Ukrainian-Jewish descent
1880 births
1937 deaths
School of the Museum of Fine Arts at Tufts faculty
19th-century male artists from the Russian Empire
People from Chornobyl
Ukrainian Jews
Jews from the Russian Empire
20th-century Russian male artists